The swimming competition at the 1991 Summer Universiade took place in Sheffield, England from July 15 to July 21, 1991.

Men's events

Legend:

Women's events

Legend:

References
Medalist Summary (Men) on GBRATHLETICS.com
Medalist Summary (Women) on GBRATHLETICS.com

1991 in swimming
Swimming at the Summer Universiade
1991 Summer Universiade